Bayan-Ovoo  (Rich ovoo) is a sum (district) of Khentii Province in eastern Mongolia. The sum had a population in 2008 of 1,581 and an area of 3,381 km².

Climate

Bayan-Ovoo has a continental climate (Köppen climate classification Dwb) with warm summers and severely cold winters. Most precipitation falls in the summer as rain, with some snow in autumn and spring. Winters are quite dry, with occasional light snow.

References

Districts of Khentii Province